Current Theega is a 2014 Indian Telugu-language romantic comedy action film produced by Manchu Vishnu on 24 Frames Factory banner and directed by G. Nageswara Reddy. It stars Manchu Manoj, Rakul Preet Singh and Jagapathi Babu. The film's music is composed by Achu while Satish Mutyala and S R Shekhar have taken care of the cinematography and editing respectively.

The film released on 31 October 2014. This film is a remake of the 2013 Tamil film Varuthapadatha Valibar Sangam. It was later dubbed in Hindi as Don Ki Jung.

Plot
Siva Rama Raju, a noted good samaritan in Parvatipuram who has a bet with Veerraju in the same village that if any one of his three daughters falls in love, he will either kill the man or cut down his ears and he takes a vow that he will marry off his daughters to the grooms of his choice, neither love marriage nor elopement. Kavita is his third daughter. Raju is a wayward youth who is deeply in love with an English teacher Sunny, in a junior college. Kavita is one of Sunny's students. Raju uses Kavita as a courier to love Sunny; as the things proceed, Raju and Kavita fall in love. The rest of the story is all about what happens when they want to get married.

Cast

Music

Achu Rajamani composed the music for this film. The soundtrack consists of 7 songs and a piece of theme music whose lyrics were penned by Ramajogayya Sastry, Varikuppala Yadagiri Goud, Anantha Sreeram and Bhaskarabhatla. Manchu Manoj sang a "Devadas break up" song, which released on 9 September 2014 along with its behind the scenes video. It was a situational break up song for the climax when the heroine dumps the hero. Nageswara Reddy and Achu suggested him to sing the song who accepted it. It received viral response and Manoj dedicated it to all the girls who inspired him. Chinmayi sang a song named "Padahaarellainaa" penned by Anantha Sreeram.

In the end of June 2014, the makers planned to release the audio in August 2014. Later it was postponed to 14 September 2014 to coincide with the occasion of Manchu Manoj's career completing 10 years. A grand promotional event was organised IN Park Hyatt hotel at Hyderabad. Dasari Narayana Rao and Ram Gopal Varma attended the audio launch as the chief guests. The soundtrack was marketed by Junglee Music.

The soundtrack received positive reviews from critics. The Times of India called it "a record that will take you by surprise" and rated it 3.5 out of 5. IndiaGlitz "Manoj refuses to be routine. In this album, he gets the songs bear his imprint. On his part, Achu delivers a decent enough output, never mind the inspirations" and called it a "good album from Achu tailor made for Manchu Manoj" and rated it 3 out of 5. In contrast, Milliblog wrote "Karthik is fabulous in his two melodies, the bordering-on-Charukesi Pilla and the short, mellow Kallalo. The soundtrack’s highlight is Padahaarellainaa, which exploits Chinmayi’s fantastic vocals to great effect and layers many interesting sounds onto a dreamy, waltz’y melody. Barring these, this soundtrack is a step down from Achu’s recent form." The soundtrack was a chart-topper and according to Trade experts, it garnered tremendous likes and has been shared in the social media extensively within hours of its official online release who called it a "viral darling".

Release

Theatrical
The film released on 31 October 2014 in 700 screens worldwide, which is the biggest release ever for Manoj Manchu. The film received an A certificate by Central Board of Film Certification due to the bold item track featuring Sunny Leone.

Home media
The film satellite rights were secured by Gemini TV for an whopping price  which is high for Manchu Manoj's films.

Reception

Critical response
The film received mixed reviews from critics.

123Telugu rated 3.25/5 stated Overall, Current Theega starts on a promising note with some well designed entertainment during the first half. The tempo dips slightly in the second half but is made up during the climax. Manoj's electrifying performance, Sunny Leone and Rakul Preet's glamor and some comedy elements makes this film a decent time pass entertainer.Gulte.com rated 3.25/5 stated Despite the shortcomings, Current Theega has enough to be a safe venture at the ticket windows. It is targeted at the rural audience and has the potential to do well in B and C centers. Current Theega can be watched once for Manchu Manoj's performance, music and star cast. Manchus surely have a winner on their hands. We will get to know the range of the film within few days and giving a verdict as Current Theega has Enough Power in it. Indiaglitz rated 3/5 and stated With a story line that is wafer-thin and a genre with inherent limitations, 'Current Teega' is not current. 
Great Andhra.com rated 3/5, stated Like most films these days, Current Theega also has a message for young lovers as a part of the story. Barring a few scenes here and there, which could have been chopped off at the editing table, Current Theega remains true to the original story and giving final verdict Not Shocking.Tupaki rated 3/5 stated Current Theega is a colorful village entertainer. It will be a definite hit and the biggest grosser for Manoj. Will do well in all centers. Current Theega will be a hatrick hit for heroine Rakul Preet Singh after venkatadri express and loukyam. New golden leg of Telugu cinema.
AP Today rated 2.75/5 stated Low Voltage!.Telugu Mirchi rated 2.5/5 stated The movie is an official remake of Tamil super hit ‘Varuthapadatha Valibar Sangam’. The film makers have made few changes to the script to suit the Telugu nativity. However, ‘Current Theega’ is the biggest release in Manoj's career at the Box-office. Surely, Manoj's electrifying performance, Rakul Preet Singh's glamour, Sunny Leone's factor and high entertainment quotient forms the major positive aspects for the film. AP Herald rated 2/5 stated An official remake of the Tamil film "Varutha Padatha Valibar Sangam", despite its isolated nature, Tamil version manages to provide concrete entertainment through its bright native treatment. The major letdown in the remake comes mainly from the script work and the direction. The script with more tongue-tied anxiety than sense, fails to capture the nature of the original and G Nageswara Reddy spineless guiding comes across as more concerned with perceived commercial viability rather than pure story-telling craft. The film received positive feedback from fans as well as the audience. HOURDOSE reviewed it by stating Overall "Current Theega" is a pakka mass masala entertainer with decent comedy, high voltage action scenes and nice music. Keeping the thin story line aside, you can surely give this film a shot for this weekend!!!

References

External links 

2014 films
2010s Telugu-language films
Telugu remakes of Tamil films
2014 action comedy films
2014 romantic comedy films
Films scored by Achu Rajamani
Indian romantic comedy films
Indian action comedy films
2014 masala films
Indian romantic action films
Films directed by G. Nageswara Reddy
2010s romantic action films